On the Night Stage is a 1915 American silent Western film directed by Reginald Barker and starring William S. Hart and Rhea Mitchell. The film is based upon a story by C. Gardner Sullivan with the scenario written by Thomas H. Ince. A copy of the film is held by the Library of Congress and several other film archives.

Plot
Saloon girl Belle Shields falls in love with and marries Alexander Austin, the town's new pastor, much to the chagrin of her sweetheart, "Silent" Texas Smith. Texas smolders with jealousy until Alexander lends him a fist during a bar fight, marking the beginning of a strong, respected friendship. Belle, having reformed herself into a proper pastor's wife, slips back into her old ways, and must rely on Texas to save her from the advances of a foppish gambler.

Cast
 William S. Hart as Texas
 Rhea Mitchell as Belle Shields
 Robert Edeson as Austin, "The Skypilot"
 Herschel Mayall as Handsome Jack Malone

References

Other sources
 Nuraypictures
 http://silenthollywood.com/onthenightstage1915.html
 http://www.allmovie.com/movie/on-the-night-stage-v36291/releases

External links

1915 films
1915 Western (genre) films
American black-and-white films
Silent American Western (genre) films
Films directed by Reginald Barker
1910s American films
1910s English-language films